John Howlett (4 April 1940 – 4 March 2019) was an English author and screenwriter who lived in Rye, East Sussex.

He started his writing career by co-writing the screenplay of the 1968 feature film if...., directed by Lindsay Anderson.

Education
Howlett attended Tonbridge School and Jesus College, Oxford where he studied history.

Screenwriting Credits
His writing credits cover film and TV and include both writing and adaptation.
1999 Doomwatch: Winter Angel (TV movie) (writer)
1999 Darkness Falls (writer)
1993 Colpo di coda (TV movie) (writer)
1992 Touch and Die (TV movie) (writer)
1992 Bonne chance Frenchie (TV mini-series) (adaptation)
1990 Where Were You That Night? (TV Movie)
1989 Crossing the Line (TV Series)
1988 Game, Set and Match (TV series)
1985 Murder of a Moderate Man (TV mini-series)
1968 Thirty-Minute Theatre (TV series)
1968 if.... (from an original story called "Crusaders" & script)

Other Work
He was also a researcher on the 1975 TV documentary James Dean: The First American Teenager. He is the author of the 1980 biography of Frank Sinatra, together with a biography of James Dean and a number of works of fiction.

His full book credits are:

Fiction
The Christmas Spy (1975)
Tango November (1976)
Maximum Credible Accident (1980)
Orange (1985)
Murder of a Moderate Man (1985)
Cry (1995)
Love Of An Unknown Soldier (2010)
A Long Road Home (2012)
When War Came Again (2012)
First Snow Of Winter (2012)

Non fiction
James Dean (1975)
Frank Sinatra (1979)

Theatre
Dean - West End musical with Robert Campbell. Subsequently produced in Japan by the Takarazuka Revue
Lorca - Musical with Theo Jaskolkowski & Robert Campbell

Radio - (BBC Radio 4)
Soldier, Poor man, Beggarman, Thief
Next Man Through the Door
Gone for Soldiers
Maximum Credible Accident

References

https://www.amazon.co.uk/gp/product/B005I4OWWK/ref=docs-os-doi_0

External links 
 

Alumni of Jesus College, Oxford
English screenwriters
People from Rye, East Sussex
1940 births
2019 deaths